The Risser's Mill Covered Bridge or Horst's Mill Covered Bridge was a covered bridge that spanned Little Chickie's Creek in Lancaster County, Pennsylvania, United States.  It was burnt by an arsonist on July 8, 2002.  As of October 2006, a concrete bridge is being built 100 feet north of the site of the bridge.  Plans exist to rebuild a replica of the bridge on the original hand-laid stone bridge abutments.
The bridge's WGCB Number is 38-36-36.  Added in 1980, it was listed on the National Register of Historic Places as structure number 80004612, and was removed from the Register on December 5, 2003.

History 
The bridge was built in 1872 by Elias McMellen using a Burr arch truss design.

Dimensions 
Length: 82 feet (25.0 m) total length
Width: 15 feet (4.6 m) total width

References 

Covered bridges in Lancaster County, Pennsylvania
Bridges completed in 1872
Covered bridges on the National Register of Historic Places in Pennsylvania
Covered bridges in the United States destroyed by arson
Arson in Pennsylvania
National Register of Historic Places in Lancaster County, Pennsylvania
Road bridges on the National Register of Historic Places in Pennsylvania
Wooden bridges in Pennsylvania
Burr Truss bridges in the United States
Former National Register of Historic Places in Pennsylvania